SAS Spioenkop (F147) is the third of four s for the South African Navy built by the European South African Corvette Consortium. She was named by Ms Thandi Modise, the then Chairperson of the Portfolio Committee on Defence, in Hamburg, Germany, on 4 June 2003.

Construction
They were manufactured by the European South African Corvette Consortium (ESACC), consisting of the German Frigate Consortium (Blohm+Voss, Thyssen Rheinstahl and Howaldtswerke Deutsche Werf), African Defence Systems (part of the French Thales Group defence company) and a number of South African companies.

The ships were built to the MEKO modular design concept, and they are designated by the manufacturer as the MEKO A-200SAN class. Some controversy exists as to the class type of the vessel, with both the manufacturer and the South African Navy referring to her as a "corvette", but other similar vessels in other navies being referred to as frigates. Some have claimed that the use of the word corvette was a political decision made by the South African government to ease criticism of the procurement of the vessels.

SAS Spioenkop was built at the Blohm + Voss shipyards in Hamburg, Germany, and arrived in South Africa on 31 May 2004.

Namesake
As with all the other ships of the Valour class, Spioenkop is named after a famous South African battle or instance of great valour. In this case the famous Battle of Spion Kop between the Boers and Britain, during the Anglo-Boer War.

Notable deployments

Exercise Whippet
The South African Navy conducted its first combined tactical Exocet missile firing exercise when the frigates, SAS Spioenkop and SAS Mendi, fired two missiles (one from each frigate) at MFV Azalea, an old fishing trawler donated to the SA Navy by I&J fishing company for use a target ship.

Exercise Dolphin 2008
A joint naval exercise between Ghana and South Africa. The following ships were involved in the exercise, SAS Spioenkop and the Ghanaian Naval vessels Anzone, Bonsu, Yogaga, Sero and Achimota. Activities included simulated opposed and unopposed boarding, fleet work as well as rescue assist. To add to this schedule there was a contingent of Ghanaian media representatives on board, who were ferried between the different vessels.

Exercise Greenpoint 2008
This was an exercise in preparation for the FIFA 2010 World Cup Soccer tournament, as part of Operation KGWELA. A combined exercise with SANDF and SAPS personnel took place over the period 13 to 19 March 2008 in Cape Town to formalise the air defence concept for the tournament.

Operation Caraway 2008
The ship conducted a three-month, six-country visit to the Far East. Spioenkop visited Singapore from 3–8 October, Shanghai in the People’s Republic of China from 16–20 October, Kota Kinabalu in Malaysia from 25–29 October, Ho Chi Minh City in the Socialist Republic of Vietnam from 31 October to 5 November), Cochin in India from 14–20 November and Port Louis in Mauritius from 26 November to 1 December. The ship conducted naval exercises with the Singaporean Navy, the People's Liberation Army Navy of the People's Republic of China, the Indian Navy and the Mauritian Coast Guard. The ship's company also engaged in various diplomatic related activities with all the countries visited.

FIFA World Cup 2010
SAS Spioenkop patrolled the coast during the 2010 FIFA World Cup and provided its radar for anti-aircraft surveillance to boost security for the event.

IBSAMAR II trilateral exercises 2010
SAS Spioenkop took part in the trilateral exercise along with ships from the South African, Indian and Brazilian navies.

Exercise Red Lion
Held annually, Exercise Red Lion is run by Fleet Command and concentrates its efforts on preparing all available vessels for future Force Employment as a Task Group. The latest exercise was held between 4 and 15 March 2013 around Cape Town.

Exercise Shared Accord 2013
SAS Spioenkop participated in a beach landing exercise on 29 July as part of the bilateral Exercise Shared Accord between the United States and South Africa.

Interop West Deployment 2013
The ship conducted a six-week Military Diplomatic Mission to the West Coast of Africa from October to November. She visited Namibia, Angola, Nigeria, Ghana, Equatorial Guinea and Senegal.

Operation Copper 2013-2014
The ship conducted a five-month anti-piracy mission in the Mozambique Channel from 28 December 2013 to 14 May 2014. The mission for Operation Copper is to provide maritime security and prevent piracy in the Mozambique Channel. The vessel was relieved by the offshore patrol vessel .

Refit 2022

After the ship returned from her deployment on Operation Vikela as part of the SADC Mission in Mozambique, Spioenkop was scheduled to enter an extensive maintenance period.

References

Valour-class frigates
Ships built in Hamburg
2003 ships
Frigates of the South African Navy
Military units and formations in Cape Town